Lovisa Lindh (born 9 July 1991) is a Swedish middle-distance runner competing primarily in the 800 metres. She competed at the 2016 IAAF World Indoor Championships without advancing to the final. At the 2016 European Championships she won the bronze medal.

Competition record

Personal bests
Outdoor
800 metres – 1:58.77 (Lausanne 2017)
1000 metres – 2:35.15 National Record (Gothenburg 2017 )
1500 metres – 4:09.03 (Florø 2017 )
Indoor
800 metres – 2:01.37 (Belgrade 2017)
1500 metres – 4:26.15 (Bollnäs 2012)

References

External links
 

1991 births
Living people
Swedish female middle-distance runners
People from Vaxholm Municipality
European Athletics Championships medalists
Olympic athletes of Sweden
Athletes (track and field) at the 2016 Summer Olympics
Sportspeople from Stockholm County